Paris By Night 79: Dreams is a Paris By Night program produced by Thúy Nga that was filmed at the San Jose Center for the Performing Arts, on August 20, 2005. The show was MC'ed by Nguyễn Ngọc Ngạn and Nguyễn Cao Kỳ Duyên.

Concept

Following the tradition of Paris by Night 53, 60, 65, 69, and 73, the show is one of the recurring "duets" special. The show is one of the most expensive Paris by Night shows to date, costing $1.2 million to produce. The theme is thought to be inspired by Cirque du Soleil.

Track list

Disc 1

 Mộng Đẹp © (Tùng Châu & Quốc Dũng) – Hồ Lệ Thu, Như Loan & Loan Châu
 Trọn Kiếp Bình Yên (Đăng Anh) – Minh Tuyết & Dương Triệu Vũ
 Tóc Mai Sợi Vắn Sợi Dài (Phạm Duy) – Trần Thái Hòa & Ngọc Hạ
 Video Clip: Dreams – Nguyễn Ngọc Ngạn, Nguyễn Cao Kỳ Duyên, Kiều Linh & Nguyễn Vương Định
 Đêm Ngậm Ngùi © (Lương Bằng Vinh) – Như Quỳnh & Tâm Đoan
 Liên Khúc:
Đêm Vũ Trường (Lê Minh Bằng)
Phận Tơ Tằm (Lê Minh Bằng)
- Phương Hồng Quế & Thái Châu

- Trường Vũ & Chế Linh

Disc 2

 Phần Đầu Đĩa 2
 Nhạc Cảnh: Hờn Ghen (Nguyễn Minh Anh) – Nguyễn Hưng & Thùy Vân
 Tình Lúa Duyên Trăng (Hoài An - Hồ Đình Phương) – Quang Lê & Ngọc Hạ
 Hãy Trả Lời Em (Tuấn Nghĩa) – Ngọc Liên & Thế Sơn
 Em Đi (Đức Huy) – Bằng Kiều, Tuấn Ngọc, Thái Châu, Nhật Trung & Nguyễn Ngọc Ngạn
 Nếu Không Có Em Bên Đời (Et si tu n'existais pas) (Joe Dassin. Vietnamese lyrics: Vũ Xuân Hùng)– Như Loan & Trần Thái Hòa
 Chợ Đời © (Nhật Trung) – Nhật Trung & Hoài Phương
 Chờ Anh Nói Một Lời © (Nhật Trung) – Lưu Bích & Nguyễn Hưng 
 Nối Lại Tình Xưa (Ngân Giang) – Như Quỳnh & Mạnh Quỳnh
 Đau Một Lần Rồi Thôi (Huy Cường) – Thế Sơn & Hồ Lệ Thu
 Con Tim Dại Khờ (Nguyễn Hoài Anh)  – Lương Tùng Quang & Tú Quyên
 Tình Yêu Cho Em (Vivo Per Lei) (Gatto Panceri & Valerio Zelli. Vietnamese lyrics: Nhật Ngân) – Khánh Hà & Bằng Kiều
 Cơn Mưa Bất Chợt (Sỹ Đan) – Thủy Tiên & Lương Tùng Quang
 Sweet Dreams (Are Made of This) (Annie Lennox & David A. Stewart) – Adam Hồ & Văn Quỳnh
 Khiêu Vũ Bên Nhau (Monday, Tuesday... Laissez-moi danser) (Pierre Delanoë, Toto Cutugno & Cristiano Minellono. Vietnamese lyrics: Vũ Xuân Hùng) – Lương Tùng Quang, Tommy Ngô, Dương Triệu Vũ, Minh Tuyết, Tâm Đoan, Bảo Hân, Tú Quyên, Hồ Lệ Thu & Lynda Trang Đài

Behind The Scenes (Hậu Trường Sân Khấu)

Paris by Night

vi:Paris By Night 79